The São Francisco Ridge (in Portuguese, Serra de São Francisco) is a topographic elevation in the Brazilian Highlands, situated in the south of the cities of Votorantim and Sorocaba, state of São Paulo, Brazil.

History 
The origin of the name dates from the founding of Sorocaba 1654 by Baltasar Fernandes and as the aim was to transform the local village, built a chapel dedicated to Nossa Senhora da Ponte. Esteves Brás Leme stood near the mouth of the Sarapuí River and his son-Pascoal Moreira Cabral Leme in place that would be called Serra de São Francisco (Votorantim). Braz Tevês and Pascoal Moreira Cabral Leme built their big house in Itapeva starting the planting of sugar cane and the consequent use of milling. The farm, which was named São Francisco.

Geology 
The relief of the mountain is held by Granitic Massif São Francisco or simply Granite São Francisco, which is an elongated body according to a northeast–southwest intrusive metasedimentary rocks of the São Roque Group. It is a biotite granite dominant pink color, composition syenogranitic with fluorite as locally accessory amphibole and sodic. It subalkaline nature, type A, with locally rapakivi texture. Form extensive fields and rocky boulders. The age of this granite is Neoproterozoic, estimated at 560 million years. It is one of the granites with high natural radioactivity of the state of Sao Paulo, either by their frequent exposure of rocky, with fractures, either by the same mineralogical composition. The highest values of natural radioactivity are recorded in the canyon of the Sorocaba River, downstream from the Dam Itupararanga. At the time of World War II was to search tungsten in the São Francisco Ridge. The work was done by geologist Theodoro Knecht, who described the mineral occurrences of tin and wolframite in the western portion of the mountain, and endograisens associated with quartz veins. Adjacent to the northern flank of the São Francisco ridge are the mining of limestone for cement Votorantim Group, the factories of St. Helena and Santa Rita, and other mines near the Pirapora river in the west part of the ridge. Along the eastern edge of the mountain is the municipality of Aluminium, next to the aluminium plant of Companhia Brasileira de Aluminio (CBA).

Geomorphology 
The ridge is part of the Brazilian Highlands, where the basement crystalline rocks dominate and shape the Appalachian fall line, as defined by Professor Ab'Saber, being the limit with the low-lying areas of the Peripheral Depression, dominated the rocks of the Parana Basin, the latter with gentle slope and mound. The highest elevations in the São Francisco ridge reach 1035 m (above sea level) in the eastern portion, near the headwaters of the river Pirajibú. The mountain becomes progressively lower toward Salto de Pirapora in the west, where the altitudes are located around 800 m in this region there is an intersection of the mountain by the Pirapora River. The region of the mountain is the source of the Sorocaba River, formed by the rivers Sorocabuçu and Sorocamirim. The Itupararanga Dam was built in Sorocaba river canyon. Dominate steep slopes on the north flank of the mountain, overlooking the Sorocaba and Votorantim, and softer on the south flank toward Piedade.

Environment 
Much of the São Francisco ridge is within the Environmental Protection Area (APA) of Itupararanga Dam that aims to protect all water sources, such as Itupararanga Dam. The site is of special ecological interest because it represents one of the last refuges of wild fauna and flora and the region. Because the saw is supported by granitic rocks dominate lithosols paved and rock, where there is lush vegetation, except in reforestation located. On the northern flank of the mountain there is intense mining activity.

Tourism and leisure 
From the top of the mountain are views of the region of Sorocaba, including Ipanema Hill. In view of the foothills of São Francisco ridge, from the higher parts of Sorocaba and Votorantim, the mountain appears to be majestic, and similarly, from the Chilena viewpoint high on the Ipanema Hill.
In the higher parts of the mountain there is the Penha Chapel, rebuilt in 1724 by Tim de Oliveira, still exists today in the hills. It is a landmark of the region and has been held annually for Votorantim pilgrimage to the site. Near the Penha Chapel, given the strategic point for telecommunications, television towers had.
In Itupararanga Dam water sports and camping there. In recent years he has noticed an increase of cyclists visiting the mountain.

Access 
Access roads are Route SP-79, Raimundo Soares Antunes, connecting Votorantim to Piedade, the old-Piedade Sorocaba road that passes through the São Francisco Farm, the road Votorantim linking to Itupararanga Dam, roads departing from Brigadeiro Tobias and Inhaíba villages, Alumínio and access between Votorantim and Salto de Pirapora.

See also 
 Itupararanga Dam
 Sorocaba
 Votorantim

References

External links 
 Serra de São Francisco biodiversity (pt)
Photos of Itupararanga Dam at São Francisco Ridge

Mountains of Brazil
Landforms of São Paulo (state)